Philip Arthur Gaglardi (January 13, 1913 – September 23, 1995), sometimes known as Flying Phil, was a politician in the Canadian province of British Columbia. He is best known for his service as Minister of Highways in the BC government from 1952 to 1972.

Private and family life
Gaglardi was born in Mission, British Columbia as one of eleven children to poor Italian immigrants.  In 1938 he married Jennie Sandin, a Pentecostal minister. He attended Bible school and was also ordained as a Pentecostal minister. In 1944 they moved to Kamloops and he became the leader of Calvary Temple (now St. Andrew's).  Phil began the radio program “Chapel in the Sky” and Jennie the “Aunt Jennie” broadcast. Gaglardi continued his weekly 15 minute broadcasts throughout his political career.

The Gaglardis had two sons: Bob Gaglardi, founder of Northland Properties (whose holdings include the 60-hotel Sandman Hotel chain and 100-plus restaurants under various labels), whose family is the current owner of the National Hockey League's Dallas Stars, and Bill Gaglardi, a Calgary businessman.

Political career
Gaglardi was first elected to the legislature in the 1952 election as a Member of the Legislative Assembly (MLA) as part of the British Columbia Social Credit League. The party had enough seats to form a minority government, but had no leader. Gaglardi ran for the post, but lost in a vote of caucus members. It was reported that Gaglardi lost by 10 to 9 to W.A.C. Bennett, but according to Bennett's biographer, Bennett received 10 of the 19 votes and Gaglardi one.  He won a total of seven elections and served as a Cabinet minister for the full duration of Bennett's time as Premier.

Minister of Highways
Gaglardi was appointed Minister of Public Works on the day Bennett's cabinet was sworn into office, August 1, 1952. His office included responsibility for highways. In 1952 Bennett created a new Department of Highways and appointed Gaglardi as the first Minister of Highways. His term was marked by the rapid expansion of the province's paved road system, as well as the completion of most of the major road bridges in British Columbia. Bennett described the building program as "the greatest highway building program.per capita in the entire Western world."

Gaglardi as Minister of Highways was also given responsibility for BC Ferries and its rapid expansion soon after it was nationalized in 1960. He claimed he "built the whole system around my own impatience."
 
What really got him noticed was the way he managed to convince a reluctant W.A.C. Bennett to buy the government a Learjet. Premier Bennett was traveling in a newly inaugurated government-owned ferry to Prince Rupert. To demonstrate that the ferry was too slow for government business, he convinced a pilot friend to fly him to Prince Rupert in a Learjet, thereby managing to get there before Bennett did. Gaglardi waited on the dock to greet the Premier with a purchase contract for the plane. The plane was quickly purchased.

The explanation of Gaglardi's nickname was his propensity for getting speeding tickets whilst driving in large-engined cars around the province checking on the progress of road construction or in his own words "testing the curves." When pulled over, Flying Phil would flash his pilot's license saying: He wasn't driving too fast, he was flying too low.

In the 1963 provincial general election he defeated Davie Fulton, who had retired from federal politics to head the BC Progressive Conservative Party and chose Kamloops as his preferred entry to the Legislature.

It was alleged that in 1968 Gaglardi came under fire in the legislature over re-occurring allegations of preferred highway access to property owned by his sons, use of departmental facilities to provide sign material and construction to benefit their properties, and departmental work performed on his private property.  He announced his resignation in March 1968 after revelations of him having his daughter-in-law and grandson in the government jet. Bennett subsequently let it be known that Gaglardi had been fired', which was not the case.  He continued in Cabinet as Minister without portfolio.

Minister of Social Welfare/Minister of Rehabilitation and Social Improvement
In 1969 Gaglardi was appointed to the social welfare portfolio which he renamed the Department of Rehabilitation and Social Improvement. He spoke publicly about "deadbeats", vowed to become "the roughest, toughest, most effective welfare minister the world has ever known", and created an agency to assist the indigent in getting jobs.

During the 1972 provincial general election, he predicted that Bennett would resign soon after winning the election, accused the premier of being "an old man who doesn't understand what is happening with the young people of this province", claimed the cabinet was "filled with square pegs in round holes", and stated, "I'm the only real choice for the job."   Gaglardi was defeated in the 1972 general election which the Socreds lost to the New Democratic Party.

Mayor of Kamloops
Phil Gaglardi served as mayor of Kamloops from 1988–1990. He led a fledgling municipal political party called Team Action whose candidates won a majority of the city council.

After politics
After leaving politics he involved himself in the running of his son's Sandman Inns.

In 1978, he seriously considered running for the leadership of the federal Social Credit Party of Canada but later withdrew.
Gaglardi died on September 23, 1995.

Gaglardi Way, a major thoroughfare in Burnaby, British Columbia connecting the Trans-Canada Highway to Simon Fraser University, is named for him.

A statue of Gaglardi was erected in Kamloops. The statue stands at 5-foot 4 inches tall, which depending on who you asked was his height.

Quotes
 "Air pollution is the smell of money" 
 "If I'm lying, it's only because I'm telling the truth" 
 As a minister both of a church and of the crown, he noted that he saw his duty to keep the highways "in such shape that motorists will avoid the language which would deny them access to the highway to heaven"
Speaking of unions, in 1959 in the Legislature:  "We don't need any Hoffas or gangsterism in this province".
"They talk of Roman roads in Europe but they don't compare to Gaglardi roads in British Columbia."

Cabinet Positions

References

Sources
 Mitchell, David J., WAC and The Rise of British Columbia, Vancouver/Toronto, 1983. 
 Rothenburger, Mel, Friend o' Mine, Orca Books, 1999.

External links
Kamloops News article 2009-07-21, retrieved 2011-04
St. Andrews on the Square - history
Knowtheway.org "Testimony of Aunt Jennie"
Cartoon of Bennett, Phil Gaglardi, President Lyndon Johnson, and Prime Minister Lester Pearson by Len Norris

1913 births
1995 deaths
20th-century Canadian politicians
British Columbia Social Credit Party MLAs
Canadian Pentecostal pastors
Canadian people of Italian descent
Mayors of Kamloops
Members of the Executive Council of British Columbia
People from Mission, British Columbia